The 2006–07 South-West Indian Ocean cyclone season featured the second-most intense tropical cyclones for a season in the tropical cyclone basin, only behind the 2018–19 season. The basin contains the waters of the Indian Ocean south of the equator and west of 90°E. Météo-France's meteorological office in Réunion (MFR), the official Regional Specialized Meteorological Center for the South-West Indian Ocean, tracked 15 tropical disturbances, of which eleven attained gale-force winds. The season began in October 2006 with a short-lived tropical disturbance, followed by Anita in November, which was the first named storm of the season. Cyclone Bondo was the first of six intense tropical cyclones, which took a rare track through the southern Seychelles before making landfall on northwest Madagascar, killing 11 people. Severe Tropical Storm Clovis lasted from December 2006 to January 2007; it struck eastern Madagascar, killing four people.

In January 2007, Cyclone Dora became one of the two strongest storms of the season, with maximum sustained winds of 195 kilometres per hour (120 miles per hour); Dora only lightly affected the Mauritian island of Rodrigues. The season was most active in February, beginning with Severe Tropical Storm Enok, which formed off eastern Madagascar and later struck the island of St. Brandon. The next storm, Cyclone Favio, tied Dora as the season's strongest storm. Favio took an unusual path south of Madagascar before entering the Mozambique Channel and striking southern Mozambique, killing 10 people and causing widespread flooding. Cyclone Gamede stalled northwest of the Mascarene Islands for a few days in late February, resulting in historic rainfall totals on the French island of Réunion. Over a nine-day period, Gamede dropped 5512 mm (217 in) of rainfall at Commerson Crater, making it one of the wettest tropical cyclones on record. February concluded with Cyclone Humba, which remained over the eastern portion of the basin.

The season's deadliest storm was Cyclone Indlala, which struck northeastern Madagascar on March 15. The cyclone killed 150 people and caused over US$240 million in damage, after resulting in widespread flooding. Less than three weeks after Indlala, Cyclone Jaya struck northeastern Madagascar at a similar location, disrupting ongoing relief efforts and causing one death. The season concluded on April 12, when a subtropical cyclone in the Mozambique Channel transitioned into an extratropical cyclone.



Seasonal forecast and summary 

On October 13, 2006, the Mauritius Meteorological Services (MMS) issued their seasonal outlook for the South-west Indian Ocean, anticipating a normal season with about 10 named storms. They forecast El Niño conditions for the southern hemisphere, meaning that normal to slightly above normal activity was likely. They also forecast a weak quasi-biennial oscillation, which would promote cyclone formation in the basin. Other seasonal indicators that were conducive for storm formation included above normal water temperatures, sustained convective activity, and above normal humidity. The seasonal forecast anticipated that most storms would form west of Diego Garcia, with at least one forming in the Mozambique Channel.

Météo-France's meteorological office in Réunion (MFR) – the official Regional Specialized Meteorological Center for the South-West Indian Ocean – tracked all tropical cyclones from the east coast of Africa to 90° E, and south of the equator. Regional warning centers in Mauritius and Madagascar formally named the individual storms. The Joint Typhoon Warning Center (JTWC), which is a joint United States Navy – United States Air Force task force that issues tropical cyclone warnings for the region, also issued advisories for storms during the season.

During the season, the MFR monitored 15 tropical disturbances, including a subtropical cyclone southwest of Madagascar that ended the season in April. There were ten systems that attained the intensity of a moderate tropical storm, which has 10–minute sustained winds of at least ; this is near the long-term average, but much more active than the previous season. There were 58 days in which a tropical storm was active, or five more than the average. This was the most on record at the time, until it was surpassed by the 2018–19 season. The rest of the southern hemisphere was less active than the Indian Ocean during the 2006–07 cyclone year. The El Niño present at the beginning of the season subsided by January 2007.

Most of the storms in the season occurred in the western portion of the basin. From December 2006 to April 2007, a series of floods and storms affected Madagascar, including Bondo, Clovis, Favio, Gamede, Indlala, and Jaya; this made it the most active season in the country since the 1999–2000 South-West Indian Ocean cyclone season. The series of storms and floods left 10,000 families homeless, directly affecting 9% of the country's population. These floods left 336,470 people in emergency need of food, after the storms destroyed  worth of crops. The World Food Programme provided meals, distributed through non-governmental organizations and local officials. This covered the needs for these families until farmers were able to rebuild and regrow their food supply, using seeds provided by the Food and Agriculture Organization. The Malagasy Red Cross provided more than 10,000 residents across the country with insecticide-treated mosquito nets. The series of floods diminished the country's stock of supplies from United Nations agencies, spurring a declaration of a national emergency, and a nearly US$19.5 million appeal for international assistance. Countries around the world donated money or supplies to help the relief effort. UNICEF distributed 100 freezers and refrigerators to health facilities that bore the consequences of the active season. The agency also provided the resources to rebuild or repair 95 schools.

Systems

Moderate Tropical Storm Anita 

A low-pressure area developed on November 26 to the north of Madagascar. Located within an area of moderate wind shear, the system consolidated its associated convection while moving southwestward. The JTWC classified the system as Tropical Cyclone 03S on November 29. That day, the disturbance turned to the south, paralleling the east coast of Mozambique while moving around a ridge. Anita soon encountered higher wind shear, causing the convection to diminish over the center, and for Anita to weaken back to a tropical depression. The MFR stopped tracking Anita on December 3.

While moving close to Mozambique, Anita dropped heavy rainfall in southeast Tanzania, reaching  over 24 hours. Heavy rainfall also occurred in the Comoros, eastern Mozambique, and northwest Madagascar, causing flash flooding.

Intense Tropical Cyclone Bondo 

A tropical disturbance developed on December 15 in the central Indian Ocean west of Diego Garcia. It strengthened into Moderate Tropical Storm Bondo on December 18. Thereafter, the storm rapidly intensified while moving westward, taking advantage of favorable atmospheric conditions. Within 18 hours of being named, Bondo intensified into tropical cyclone status, or the equivalent of a minimal hurricane. While near peak intensity, Bondo passed just south of Agaléga island, before weakening slightly and moving through the Farquhar Group of islands belonging to the Seychelles, becoming the strongest cyclone to affect that island group in decades. Bondo turned southwestward and weakened, followed by re-intensification as it neared the northern tip of Madagascar. Bondo paralleled the coast briefly before it made landfall near Mahajanga on December 25. The storm continued southward, and was last tracked by the MFR on December 28.

Due to its small size, Bondo's winds did not exceed  on Agaléga, despite passing close by near peak intensity. In the Seychelles, Bondo severely damaged buildings and vegetation on Providence Atoll. High waves caused flooding elsewhere in the archipelago. In Madagascar, Bondo killed 11 people when it struck the island's west coast. The storm's high winds, reaching  in Mahajanga, damaged buildings and left around 20,000 people homeless.

Severe Tropical Storm Clovis 

Toward the end of December, the Intertropical Convergence Zone (ITCZ) was active across the southern Indian Ocean. An area of thunderstorms persisted west of Diego Garcia on December 24, which wrapped around a developing circulation. On the next day, the MFR designated the system as Tropical Disturbance 4. The system drifted to the southwest, encountering an area of high wind shear on December 27, causing the circulation to become exposed and weaken. A new, larger circulation developed within the system, prompting the MFR to issue new warnings on Tropical Disturbance 5 on December 29, located southeast of Agaléga. The MFR upgraded the system to Moderate Tropical Storm Clovis on December 31 while the storm was near Tromelin Island. Clovis continued to the south-southwest, steered by a ridge to its southeast. Satellite imagery at this time showed a small eye in the center of the convection. While near peak intensity, Clovis made landfall in eastern Madagascar near Nosy Varika on January 3. The storm rapidly weakened over land while executing a small loop, dissipating on January 4.

High waves affected the north coast of Mauritius. Clovis killed four people in Madagascar, and left 13,465 people homeless. In the country, the storm Clovis dropped heavy rainfall, reaching  in Mananjary. The rains caused flooding, which damaged houses, power grids, and crops. At least  of rice farms in Mananjary were damaged, representing about 30% of the harvest. Other damaged crops include cassava, banana, vanilla, and fruit trees. The floods left roads impassable in Nosy Varika, which limited communications along with power and phone outages.

Intense Tropical Cyclone Dora 

On January 26, an area of convection persisted west of Diego Garcia. That day, the MFR designated it as a tropical disturbance. Located in an area of low wind shear, the system slowly organized while moving southwestward, developing more convection and outflow over time. On January 28, the JTWC designated the system as Tropical Cyclone 10S. On the next day, the MFR upgraded the system to Moderate Tropical Storm Dora. The storm quickly intensified, and the JTWC upgraded Dora to the equivalent of a minimal hurricane on January 30. On February 1, the MFR upgraded Dora to tropical cyclone status. By that time, the cyclone was moving slowly south-southeastward between two ridges. Dora turned back to the southwest on February 2, and briefly weakened before re-intensifying, possibly the result of an eyewall replacement cycle. While at its peak intensity, Dora resembled an annular cyclone, with a large eye and a symmetrical cloud pattern. Cyclone Dora maintained peak intensity for about 12 hours before weakening due to cooler, drier air from the southeast. On February 5, Dora weakened below tropical cyclone status, as its forward movement also slowed. On February 6, Dora passed about 165 km (105 mi) east of Rodrigues. The thunderstorms around the thunderstorms dwindled due to higher wind shear, until the circulation was entirely exposed on February 9. On that day, the MFR reclassified Dora as an extratropical cyclone. The agency tracked the storm for four more days as the storm curved to the south.

The Mauritius Meteorological Service first issued cyclone warnings for Rodrigues on January 31, and continued issuing warnings for the island until February 7 when the storm passed the area. Dora dropped  of rainfall on the island, and gusts reached .

Severe Tropical Storm Enok 

A tropical disturbance formed off the east coast of Madagascar on February 6. That day, the JTWC issued a Tropical Cyclone Formation Alert, indicating rapid development of the small weather system. The nascent system moved northeastward, an unusual track caused by a trough extending northwestward from the remnants of Cyclone Dora, as well as ridge to the north. With good outflow and low wind shear, the small system intensified quickly on February 9. That day, the MFR upgraded the system to Severe Tropical Storm Enok, and the JTWC classified the storm as Tropical Cyclone 13S. That day, Enok passed just north of St. Brandon, which reported a calm lasting a few minutes. The storm moved quickly to the southeast and weakened due to higher wind shear and dry air. Late on February 10, Enok passed just northeast of Rodrigues. On the next day, the storm weakened to into a tropical depression and turned back to the west. The MFR discontinued advisories on February 13.

Rainfall on the island reached .

Intense Tropical Cyclone Favio 

Cyclone Favio developed as a tropical disturbance on February 11 to the southwest of Diego Garcia. It moved southwestward due to a ridge to its southeast, gradually organizing amid favorable conditions. The JTWC first classified the system as Tropical Cyclone 14S on February 14. A day later, the MFR upgraded the system to Moderate Tropical Storm Favio, and later that day, the storm passed about 120 km (75 mi) northwest of Rodrigues. The ridge to its south built westward, causing Favio to turn westward. On February 19, the MFR upgraded the storm to tropical cyclone status while Favio was passing south of Madagascar. The cyclone intensified further as it turned to the northwest in the Mozambique Channel. Favio weakened slightly before making landfall in southeastern Mozambique on February 22 near Vilankulo. This made Favio the first cyclone on record to strike Mozambique after moving south of Madagascar. The cyclone rapidly weakened over land, and the MFR discontinued advisories on February 23 when the storm was near the Mozambique/Zimbabwe border.

On Rodrigues, the cyclone produced  wind gusts, as well as heavy rainfall reaching . The storm brushed the southern coast of Madagascar, producing heavy rainfall that blocked roads. In Mozambique, Favio killed 10 people and caused additional deadly flooding that had affected the country since January. Damage from Favio and the flooding were estimated at US$71 million. The storm damaged about 130,000 homes, which displaced over 33,000 people, and also damaged 130 schools, widespread areas of crops, and power grids. Favio dropped heavy rainfall across southern Africa, causing flooding in eastern Botswana, Lesotho, Malawi, Tanzania, and Zimbabwe.

Intense Tropical Cyclone Gamede 

A tropical disturbance developed within the ITCZ on February 19 southeast of Diego Garcia. Steered by a ridge to the south, the system moved westward and gradually organized amid favorable conditions. On February 21, the MFR upgraded the system to Moderate Tropical Storm Gamede, and the JTWC initiated advisories on Tropical Cyclone 15S. Gamede gradually intensified, reaching tropical cyclone intensity on February 23. The track shifted to the west-southwest, and the outer rainbands began affecting the Mascarene Islands on February 24. A day later, the storm stalled to the north of Réunion, trapped between ridges to the east-northeast and to the south. The cyclone passed west of Réunion on February 27, after beginning a steady motion to the south-southwest. By that time, Gamede had weakened due to upwelling cooler waters, and later weakened further due to stronger wind shear. On March 2, the MFR reclassified Gamede as an extratropical cyclone, and the agency tracked the storm for four more days as the circulation again stalled before drifting westward.

Cyclone Gamede passed near St. Brandon, where its  wind gusts damaged a few windows. The cyclone left two ships missing near St. Brandon, with a combined crew of 16 people. When the storm stalled for a few days, it resulted in a prolonged period of heavy rainfall and high tides for the Mascarene Islands. On Mauritius, wind gusts reached ; the storm killed two people on the island and left 60% of islanders without power. Effects were worse on neighboring Réunion, with two fatalities, and monetary damage estimated at over €165 million (US$120 million). Gamede produced wind gusts of  alongside historic rainfall totals on Réunion. At Commerson Crater, Gamede broke numerous worldwide records for tropical cyclone rainfall, including for three days, when  was recorded, and for every duration through nine days, when  was recorded. The heavy rains produced flooding that wrecked crops and damaged infrastructure. The storm washed out a bridge over the Rivière Saint-Étienne, connecting Saint-Louis and Saint-Pierre. Later, Gamede brushed the east coast of Madagascar with winds and rainfall, In the South African province of KwaZulu-Natal, high waves closed beaches, roads, and the port of Port of Durban.

Tropical Cyclone Humba 

The BoM began monitoring a tropical low on February 19 to the northwest of the Cocos Islands. With low wind shear and good outflow, the low's deep convection pulsed around a broad, but well-defined circulation. The MFR began monitoring the system on February 20 while it was still in the Australian basin. A large ridge over western Australia steered the low to the west-southwest, bringing it into the south-west Indian Ocean on February 21. On that day, the MFR classified the system as Tropical Depression 11, and the JTWC classified it as Tropical Cyclone 16S. On February 23 upgraded it to Moderate Tropical Storm Humba, after the system organized further. The track gradually shifted to the south around the western periphery of the ridge.

After peak intensity, the cyclone encountered an upper-level trough that increased wind shear in the region. This caused Humba to weaken quickly as its convection dislocated from the circulation. Late on February 25, it fell below tropical cyclone status while entering cooler waters. On February 26, the MFR declared Humba an extratropical cyclone. The storm continued generally southward for two more days until it stalled for a day, blocked by a ridge to its south. The former Cyclone Humba turned to the southeast and was tracked by the MFR until March 4, as it moved across the southern Indian Ocean, back into the Australian region.

Intense Tropical Cyclone Indlala 

The intertropical convergence zone spawned an area of convection southwest of the Chagos on March 9. A day later, the MFR designated the system as Tropical Disturbance 12, which moved generally westward. On March 11, the MFR upgraded the system to Tropical Depression 12, and to Moderate Tropical Storm Indlala a day later. the JTWC designated the storm as Tropical Cyclone 19S. Indlala gradually intensified, reaching tropical cyclone status on March 13, and becoming an intense tropical cyclone a day later. Early on March 15, the cyclone made landfall in northeastern Madagascar on the Masoala Peninsula near Antalaha, still at its peak intensity according to the MFR. Indlala rapidly weakened over land and turned southward, eventually re-emerging into the Indian Ocean on March 18; it was last noted by the MFR on March 19.

Cyclone Indlala produced strong winds in northeastern Madagascar, with a  gust recorded at Antalaha. The cyclone also dropped heavy rainfall in the eastern portion of the country, reaching  over 48 hours in Antsohihy in northern Madagascar. These rains flooded a  area of northern Madagascar, causing the worst floods in Sofia Region since 1949. Indlala killed 150 people across Madagascar and injured another 126. Damage in the country was estimated at over US$240 million, with around 54,000 houses damaged or destroyed, leaving 188,331 people homeless. The storm also damaged 228 schools and 71 hospitals. Throughout Madagascar, the cyclone wrecked about  worth of crops.

Intense Tropical Cyclone Jaya 

An area of convection persisted southeast of the Chagos on March 26. It consolidated into Tropical Disturbance 14 on March 29 as it moved westward, steered by a ridge to the south. A day later, the system intensified into Moderate Tropical Storm Jaya, taking advantage of favorable conditions including low wind shear. Also on March 30, the JTWC classified the storm as Tropical Cyclone 22S, and later that day Jaya began to rapidly intensify; over 24 hours, its pressure dropped by 50 hPa (1.4765 inHg).

After Jaya reached peak intensity, its inner convection weakened due to dry air, and it fell below intense tropical cyclone status. On April 2, a small eye re-developed in the center of the storm, signaling a temporary period of re-intensification. It struck Madagascar less than three weeks after Indlala's deadly landfall, at an landfall location north of Indlala, which complicated relief efforts for the earlier storm. This resulted in significant flooding in the Sofia and Diana regions of the country. Wind gusts reached  at Sambava and Antalaha. Jaya killed one person in the country, and injured two others, with 8,015 people left homeless.

Jaya rapidly deteriorated as it continued westward across the island, emerging into the Mozambique Channel as a tropical disturbance on April 4. Conditions were unfavorable for re-strengthening, such as strong wind shear. The circulation of Jaya passed south of the Comoros and moved southwestward along the Mozambique coastline. It turned to the southeast away from the coast on April 6 and later moved back to the northwest. On April 8, the MFR stopped tracking the system. The circulation soon after was absorbed by a developing subtropical cyclone.

Subtropical Depression 15 

A non-tropical low originated in the southern Mozambique Channel on April 9, located off the east coast of Mozambique. The low absorbed the circulation of former Cyclone Jaya, intensifying gradually while moving to the southeast and later south. The MFR classified the system as a tropical depression on April 10, and that day the system passed west of Europa Island. It was a small cyclone, with gale-force winds extending only 95 km (65 mi) from the center. The storm accelerated to the southeast, and transitioned into an extratropical cyclone on April 12, which the MFR tracked for another day.

Other storms 
The first tropical system in the season originated from an area of convection that developed northwest of Diego Garcia on October 18. The system had defined outflow and a tight circulation, spurring the JTWC to issue a TCFA. On October 19, the MFR classified it as Tropical Disturbance 1. Environmental conditions were only marginally favorable, and the disturbance drifted to the southwest without much organization. After passing southeast of the Seychelles, the disturbance passed north of Madagascar. The MFR last issued advisories on the system on October 23.

In early January, an area of convection formed in the Mozambique Channel. The MFR classified it as Tropical Disturbance 6 on January 8, but the system failed to intensify further. The MFR discontinued advisories that day, as the disturbance would soon move over southwestern Madagascar.

The MFR designated Tropical Disturbance 13 for a weather system on March 13, located southwest of the Chagos. After the disturbance turned back to the northwest, the MFR discontinued advisories on March 17.

Storm names 
A tropical disturbance is named when it reaches moderate tropical storm strength. If a tropical disturbance reaches moderate tropical storm status west of 55°E, then the Sub-regional Tropical Cyclone Advisory Centre in Madagascar assigns the appropriate name to the storm. If a tropical disturbance reaches moderate tropical storm status between 55°E and 90°E, then the Sub-regional Tropical Cyclone Advisory Centre in Mauritius assigns the appropriate name to the storm. A new annual list is used every year so no names are retired. These were the names used this year.

Season effects 
This table lists all the storms that developed in the Southern Hemisphere during the 2006–2007 South-West Indian Ocean cyclone season. It includes their intensity, duration, name, landfalls, deaths, and damages. All data is taken from Météo-France.

|-
| One ||  || bgcolor=#| || bgcolor=#| || bgcolor=#| || None ||  ||  ||
|-
| Anita ||  || bgcolor=#| || bgcolor=#| || bgcolor=#| || Madagascar, Mozambique || || ||
|-
| Bondo ||  || bgcolor=#| || bgcolor=#| || bgcolor=#| || Madagascar, Mozambique || ||  || 
|-
| 04 ||  || bgcolor=#| || bgcolor=#| || bgcolor=#| || None || || ||
|-
| Clovis ||  || bgcolor=#| || bgcolor=#| || bgcolor=#| || Madagascar || ||  || 
|-
| 06 || January 5–8 || bgcolor=#| || bgcolor=#| || bgcolor=#| || None || || ||
|-
| Dora ||  || bgcolor=#| || bgcolor=#| || bgcolor=#| || Rodrigues || || ||
|-
| Enok ||  || bgcolor=#| || bgcolor=#| || bgcolor=#| || None || || ||
|-
| Favio || February 11–23 || bgcolor=#| || bgcolor=#| || bgcolor=#| || Mozambique, Madagascar ||  ||  || 
|-
| Gamede || February 19 – March 1 || bgcolor=#| || bgcolor=#| || bgcolor=#| || Mascarene Islands (Direct hit, no landfall) ||  ||  || 
|-
| Humba || February 20–26 || bgcolor=#| || bgcolor=#| || bgcolor=#| || None || || ||
|-
| Indlala || March 9–19 || bgcolor=#| || bgcolor=#| || bgcolor=#| || Madagascar ||  ||  || 
|-
| 13 || March 13–17 || bgcolor=#| || bgcolor=#| || bgcolor=#| || None || ||||
|-
| Jaya || March 26 – April 8 || bgcolor=#| || bgcolor=#| || bgcolor=#| || Madagascar || ||  || 
|-
| 15 || April 9–12|| bgcolor=#| || bgcolor=#| || bgcolor=#| || None || || ||
|-

See also 

 Tropical cyclones in 2006 and 2007
 Atlantic hurricane seasons: 2006, 2007
 Pacific hurricane seasons: 2006, 2007
 Pacific typhoon seasons: 2006, 2007
 North Indian Ocean cyclone seasons: 2006, 2007

References

External links 
 Joint Typhoon Warning Center (JTWC) 
 Météo France (RSMC La Réunion)
 World Meteorological Organization

 
Articles which contain graphical timelines
South-West Indian Ocean cyclone seasons
2006 SWIO
2007 SWIO